Fiskebäck Chapel is a chapel in Fiskebäck in Sweden. Belonging to the Habo Parish of the Church of Sweden, it was inaugurated on 2 December 1939.

References

External links

20th-century Church of Sweden church buildings
Churches in Habo Municipality
Chapels in Sweden
Churches completed in 1939
Churches in the Diocese of Skara